This is the page for the 2000 Consadole Sapporo season.

Competitions

Domestic results

J.League 2

Emperor's Cup

J.League Cup

Player statistics

Other pages
 J. League official site

Consadole Sapporo
Hokkaido Consadole Sapporo seasons